The Iranian toman (pronounced ; from Mongolian tümen "unit of ten thousand", see the unit called tumen) is a superunit of the official currency of Iran, the rial. One toman is equivalent to 10 rials. Although the rial is the official currency, Iranians use the toman in everyday life.

Originally, the toman consisted of 10,000 dinars. Between 1798 and 1825, the toman was also subdivided into eight rials, each of 1,250 dinars. In 1825, the qiran was introduced, worth 1,000 dinars or one-tenth of a toman.

In 1932, the rial replaced the qiran at par, with one toman being equal to 10 rial. On 7 December 2016, the Iranian government approved a call by the Iranian central bank to replace the Iranian rial with the more colloquially and historically known toman denomination. In early 2019, following the hyperinflation of the rial, the central bank made a new proposal, suggesting the currency be redenominated by introducing a new toman with a value of 10 rials.

In July 2019, the Iranian government approved a bill to change the national currency from the rial to the toman with one new toman equalling 10,000 rials, a process that would reportedly cost $160 million. The proposal would see the new toman divided into 100 qirans. This proposal was approved by the Iranian parliament in May 2020.  The changeover was expected to be phased in for up to two years.

Coins
Iranian gold coins were denominated in toman, with copper and silver coins denominated in dinar, rial or qiran. The last gold toman were issued in 1965, well after the toman had ceased to be an official Iranian currency.

Banknotes

In 1890, the Imperial Bank of Persia introduced notes in denominations of 1, 2, 3, 5, 10, 20, 25, 50, 100, 500 and 1000 toman. These notes were issued until 1923. In 1924, a second series was introduced, consisting of 1, 2, 5, 10, 20, 50 and 100 toman notes which were issued until the rial was introduced in 1932. The higher-denomination notes were subject to frequent counterfeiting. Currently, since the value of the toman has fallen so much the standard banknotes are 1,000; 2,000; 5,000; 10,000; 50,000; and 100,000 Rial notes.

German-issued World War I occupation notes

During World War I, a group of German and Turkish soldiers occupied a small portion of Iran until 1918. They circulated five different denominations of German Imperial Treasury notes (printed around 1905) with a red overprint in Persian that were used locally at the rate of 4 marks to 1 toman. In addition to the 12 qiran 10 shahi (5 mark) and 25 qiran (10 mark) notes pictured, the rest of the issue included: 5 tomans (on a 20 mark-note), 25 tomans (on a 100 mark-note), and 250 tomans (on a 1,000 mark-note). Wilhelm Wassmuss appears to be given credit for the occupation and issue of currency.

Notes

References

Sources

External links

Money in Persia
History of Money in Iran (BBC)

Banking in Iran
Currencies of Iran
Proposed currencies